The 2006 Cork Intermediate Hurling Championship was the 97th staging of the Cork Intermediate Hurling Championship since its establishment by the Cork County Board in 1909. The draw for the opening round fixtures took place on 11 December 2005. The championship began on 6 May 2006 and ended on 4 February 2007.

This was the first championship to feature relegation, with Nemo Rangers becoming the first team to suffer relegation after losing their championship proper games and two play-off games.

On 10 September 2006, Ballymartle won the championship after a 1–23 to 1–19 defeat of Carrigaline in the final at Páirc Uí Chaoimh. It remains their only championship title in the grade.

Nemo Rangers' James Masters was the championship's top scorer with 1-31.

Team changes

To Championship

Promoted from the Cork Junior A Hurling Championship
 Fr. O'Neill's

From Championship

Promoted to the Cork Premier Intermediate Hurling Championship
 Argideen Rangers

Results

First round

Second round

Third round

Relegation playoffs

Quarter-finals

Semi-finals

Final

Championship statistics

Top scorers

Overall

In a single game

References

Cork Intermediate Hurling Championship
Cork Intermediate Hurling Championship